Li Zhi (born 29 July 1993) is a Chinese footballer currently playing as a left-back for Kunshan, on loan from Chengdu Rongcheng.

Club career
Li Zhi would start his senior career with third tier football club Jingtie Locomotive in the 2015 China League Two campaign. The following season he would establish himself as a regular, however at the end of the campaign the club dissolved from the professional league. Li would be free to join another third tier club in Suzhou Dongwu where he established himself as their first choice left-back while he aided them to gain promotion.

On 12 April 2021 he transferred to second tier club in Chengdu Rongcheng. He would make his debut on 26 April 2021 in a league game against Jiangxi Beidamen, which ended in a 4-2 victory. At the end of the season he would establish himself as a regular within the team and aid them to promotion at the end of the 2021 league campaign. Despite the promotion, Li was loaned out to second tier club Kunshan where he established himself as regular within the team that won the division and promotion to the top tier at the end of the 2022 China League One campaign.

Career statistics
.

Honours

Club 
Kunshan
 China League One: 2022

References

External links

1993 births
Living people
Chinese footballers
Association football defenders
China League Two players
China League One players
Suzhou Dongwu F.C. players
Chengdu Rongcheng F.C. players